"It's not easy being green" is a phrase from the song "Bein' Green", originally sung by Kermit the Frog.
The phrase may also refer to:

 It's Not Easy Being Green, a programme on BBC Two
 It's Not Easy Being Green (album), a 1999 pop album by the Filipino rock band, Rivermaya
 It's Not Easy Being Green (Once Upon a Time), a 2014 TV episode

See also

 It's Not Easy Being...
 It's Not Easy Being a Bunny
 It's Not Easy Being Mean